Kentucky Route 817 (KY 817) is a state highway in the city of Liberty in Casey County, Kentucky. The highway runs  from Kentucky Route 70 (KY 70) north to U.S. Route 127 (US 127). KY 817 was established in 1993.

Route description
KY 817 is a connector between KY 70 (Middleburg Road) and US 127 (Wallace Wilkinson Boulevard) east of the Liberty Downtown Historic District. The highway has no intermediate intersections and includes a bridge over the Green River. The Kentucky Transportation Cabinet classifies KY 817 as a state secondary highway.

History
The Kentucky Transportation Cabinet constructed the road and designated KY 817 a state secondary highway through a January 14, 1993, official order.

Major intersections

References

0817
0817